Romsdalshalvøya, sometimes translated as the Romsdal Peninsula, is a  peninsula located in the Romsdal district of Møre og Romsdal county in Norway. The peninsula encompasses the western Norwegian municipalities of Molde, Gjemnes, and Hustadvika.

The peninsula is flanked by a number of fjords: Langfjord and Romsdalsfjord to the south, Julsund (to the west), Hustadvika to the north, Kornstadfjord and Kvernesfjord to the north-east, and Tingvollfjorden and Sunndalsfjord to the east.

About 42,000 people live on the peninsula, with another 5,000 on the adjacent islands.

References

Landforms of Møre og Romsdal
Peninsulas of Norway
Molde
Hustadvika (municipality)
Gjemnes